Norman Baker (born 1957) is a British politician.

Norman (or Norm) Baker may also refer to:
Norman Baker (architect) (1885–1968), American architect
Norman Baker (explorer) (1929–2017), American explorer, navigator on Ra, Ra II and Tigris
Norman G. Baker (1882–1958), American inventor, radio pioneer
Norman H. Baker (1931-2005), American astrophysicist
Norm Baker (1923–1989), Canadian basketball and lacrosse player
Norm Baker (baseball) (1863–1949), Major League Baseball pitcher
Norm Baker (footballer) (1917–1979), Australian footballer for Essendon